Reinhardshagen is a municipality in the district of Kassel, in Hesse, Germany. It is located 24 kilometers north of Kassel, and 21 kilometers west of Göttingen.

References

External links
 

Kassel (district)
Reinhardswald